Kirarin Revolution was adapted into an animated series in 2006, with animation provided by SynergySP and G&G Entertainment. It aired on TV Tokyo from April 7, 2006, to March 27, 2008, for a total of 102 episodes. In 2007, Viz Media's European branch licensed the anime for European release under the title Kilari!

In the week of December 24–30, 2007, the Kirarin Revolution anime series had an average viewership rating of 2.6%.

The majority of the opening and ending theme songs were performed by Morning Musume member Koharu Kusumi, who also provides the voice for Kirari Tsukishima, under the name . During the summer of 2007, Kusumi performed with Mai Hagiwara from Cute as the Japanese idol girl group Kira Pika, which their characters were also part of in the show.

The opening theme songs are "Koi Kana", used in episodes 1-26; "Balalaika", from episodes 27–51; and "Happy", from episodes 52–67, all of which were performed by Kusumi. From episodes 68–77, "Hana wo Pun", performed by Kusumi and Mai Hagiwara under the name Kira Pika, was used as the opening theme. The fifth opening theme, used from episodes 78-102, was "Chance!", once again performed by Kusumi under her character's name.

The ending theme songs are "Sugao-Flavor" by Kusumi from episodes 1-17; "Ōkina Ai de Motenashite" by Cute from episodes 18–26; "Mizuiro Melody" from episodes 27–38, "Love da yo Darling" from episodes 39–51, and "Koi no Maho wa Habibi no Bi" from episodes 52-64 by Kusumi; "Hana wo Pun"  from episodes 65-67 and "Futari wa NS" from episodes 68-77 by Kira Pika; "Ramutara" from episodes 78-90 and "Olala" from episodes 91-102 by Kusumi.

Episode list

Home release

References 

2006 Japanese television seasons
2007 Japanese television seasons
2008 Japanese television seasons
Kirarin Revolution
Lists of anime episodes